The Hazfi Cup 1998–99 was the 12th staging of Iran's football knockout competition.

Semifinals

Final

References

https://www.rsssf.org/tablesi/iran99.html

Hazfi Cup seasons
Iran
Cup